Honey is a 2003 American dance film directed by Billie Woodruff and stars Jessica Alba, Mekhi Phifer, Romeo Miller, Joy Bryant, and David Moscow, with a cameo by Missy Elliott and featured performances by Tweet, Jadakiss, and Ginuwine.

Plot

Honey Daniels works as a bartender, a record store clerk and a dance teacher at a community center run by her mother in NYC. Her dream is to become a hip hop choreographer, though her mother presses her to teach ballet uptown.

Honey and her rival Katrina are recorded having a dance off. Honey and her friend Gina find brothers Benny and Raymond street dancing and invite them to Honey's classes.

The dance-off video reaches video director Michael Ellis, who gives Honey a job as a backup dancer and asks Honey to replace his choreographer. Soon, her career brings money, fame and freedom, but takes her away from the center and the neighborhood kids.

Raymond tells Honey Benny got into a fight, in which their mother’s boyfriend split Benny's lip. Honey offers Benny a job as her assistant if he keeps out of trouble. She convinces Michael to use the kids she teaches in Ginuwine's new video. Honey begins dating Raymond's barber Chaz, who inspires her to focus on her happiness and not on the fame. She puts down a deposit on an old store she can turn into a dance studio.

When Michael says they cannot miss an important meeting, Honey cancels plans to take Gina to Atlantic City for her birthday. However, it turns out to actually be a networking party, where Michael drunkenly hits on her. She slaps him and leaves. Gina is furious to see a newspaper photo of Honey being kissed at the party she claimed was work. At the Ginuwine shoot, Michael reneges on having the kids in the video and fires her, showing up on set with Katrina.

The kids are heartbroken. Benny returns to drug dealing and lands in juvy after being busted. When Honey visits, she offers to help him once he is released, but he responds by insulting and belittling her. She tries to tell Benny how heartbroken and disappointed she is in his decisions, but he tells her to leave. As she prepares to do so, she asks how often Benny's gangster friends have visited him. Benny becomes speechless and saddened as he realizes that none of his "friends" have bothered to visit him even once. As she leaves, he realizes how disappointed Honey is with him and how she cared enough to visit following his "friends'" abandonment and his mother and brother's refusal to see him due to their own disappointment in him. Benny also realizes that he has mainly disappointed himself by making bad life choices that could get him killed or imprisoned for life. He also shows regret for being hostile towards Honey, realizing that she cared enough to offer him help.

Honey is relieved when Gina forgives her; she makes Honey realize she can achieve her hopes and dreams, but she has to start believing and trusting in herself more often. Meanwhile, since the ruined Ginuwine video, Honey's income has dried up due to Michael blackballing her in the industry. The remainder of the down payment must be paid or the store will go back on the market. Honey decides to hold a dance benefit at an abandoned church and newly-released Benny brings his dance friends to help.

Michael pushes Katrina as choreographer for a Missy Elliott video, but Missy says Katrina's sexy dance moves are not for her and she only wants Honey. Michael begs Honey to come back again, offering to buy her the studio. Realizing that the artists want her back, she refuses, declaring she will pay for the studio herself. She berates Michael for his arrogance, pointing out that not only did he blackball her out of pettiness, he also betrayed the kids.

Gina's bank manager asks arts donors to attend the benefit, which is a full house and everyone is enthusiastic about the performances. Honey's mother finally sees that the dance form her daughter loves can give her everything that ballet could. The bank manager assures Honey the building is fully funded.

Missy Elliott arrives as the benefit finishes, rushing in to meet Honey. She introduces Honey to R&B group Blaque at her new dance studio, The Bronx Dance Center, to prepare their new video.

Cast
 Jessica Alba as Honey Daniels, a hip-hop choreographer
 Mekhi Phifer as Chaz, a barber, Honey's boyfriend
 Romeo Miller (credited as Lil' Romeo) as Benny
 Joy Bryant as Gina, Honey's best friend
 David Moscow as Michael Ellis, a music producer
 Lonette McKee as Mrs. Connie Daniels, Honey's mom
 Zachary Isaiah Williams as Raymond, Benny's brother
 Laurie Ann Gibson as Katrina, Honey's rival

A number of popular hip hop and R&B musicians, groups and producers play themselves in prominent cameos, including Missy Elliott, Jadakiss, Sheek Louch, Shawn Desman, Ginuwine, Rodney Jerkins, 3rd Storee, Tweet, and Blaque.

Production
The film is inspired by the life of choreographer Laurieann Gibson, who was the film's choreographer and appeared on screen as Katrina, the main character's rival.
	 
Singer/actress Aaliyah was reportedly originally cast as Honey, though the role was later recast to Jessica Alba due to Aaliyah's death in August 2001. However, in 2020, director Bille Woodruff debunked the rumor, stating: "That’s incorrect. It was supposed to be Beyoncé. That’s been widely reported but it’s incorrect, [Beyoncé] couldn’t do it because of her touring schedule for her first album Dangerously in Love."

Reception

Critical response

Honey was released to mostly negative reviews. 
Rotten Tomatoes gives the film a score of 21% based on reviews from 116 critics, with an average rating of 4.20/10. The critical consensus reads, "An attractive Jessica Alba and energetic dance numbers provide some lift to this corny and formulaic movie".
Metacritic, based on 30 reviews, gives the film a score of 37 out of 100, signifying generally unfavorable reviews.

A. O. Scott of The New York Times was one of the critics to give the film a positive review, noting that it "brings out the wholesome, affirmative side of the hip-hop aesthetic without being overly preachy, although it will not impress anyone with its originality."

Box office
The film opened at #2 at the U.S. box office, earning US$12.9 million in its opening weekend, behind The Last Samurai. The final box office was $30.3 million in the U.S. and Canada and $31.9 million in other countries, for a total of $62.2 million worldwide.

Music
 

A soundtrack containing hip hop, R&B, funk and disco music was released on November 11, 2003 by Elektra Records. It peaked at #105 on the Billboard 200 and #47 on the Top R&B/Hip-Hop Albums charts.

Sequels
Bille Woodruff, the director of Honey, also directed three sequels, the theatrically released Honey 2 (2011) and two straight-to-video sequels Honey 3: Dare to Dance (2016) and Honey: Rise Up and Dance (2018), each with different casts.

References

External links

2000s musical drama films
American dance films
American musical drama films
American romantic drama films
American romantic musical films
2003 directorial debut films
Films directed by Bille Woodruff
Films set in New York City
Films shot in New York City
Films shot in Toronto
2000s hip hop films
Universal Pictures films
Films produced by Marc E. Platt
2003 drama films
2003 films
2000s English-language films
2000s American films